"German" is the debut single by Australian hip hop group No Money Enterprise, released on 1 November 2019. 

"German" peaked at number 37 on the ARIA Singles Chart and number 26 on the New Zealand Singles Chart, and received a nomination for Most Performed Hip Hop / Rap Work at the 2021 APRA Music Awards.

Critical reception
Tommy Faith of Triple J Unearthed said of the song: "These boys have a serious future ahead of them if they can keep dropping heaters like "German". The beat puts them in a different lane to plenty of the blossoming drill artists coming through right now and it’s the perfect oil slick for them to flow over."

Commercial performance
"German" peaked at number 37 on the ARIA Singles Chart and at number 26 on the New Zealand Singles Chart. It was certified gold in both countries.

Awards and nominations

! 
|-
! scope="row"| 2021
| "German"
| Most Performed Hip Hop / Rap Work
| 
| 
|}

Live performances
On 26 November 2021, No Money Enterprise performed "German" alongside their cover of the Notorious B.I.G.'s song "Mo Money Mo Problems" for Australian youth broadcaster Triple J's Like a Version segment.

Track listings

Charts

Weekly charts

Year-end charts

Certifications

References

2019 debut singles
2019 songs
No Money Enterprise songs